Hedypathes is a genus of beetles in the family Cerambycidae, containing the following species:

 Hedypathes betulinus (Klug, 1825)
 Hedypathes curvatocostatus Aurivillius, 1923
 Hedypathes monachus (Erichson in Schomburg, 1848)

References

Acanthoderini